Grabtown may refer to:
Grabtown, Bertie County, North Carolina, an unincorporated community in Bertie County, North Carolina
Grabtown, Johnston County, North Carolina, an unincorporated community in Johnston County, North Carolina